Clementi Public Library is a public library in Clementi, Singapore, in Clementi Mall. It is near Clementi Bus Interchange and Clementi MRT station.

History
Officially opened on 23 April 2011 by Mr Lim Hng Kiang, Minister for Trade and Industry and Advisor to Telok Blangah Grassroots Organisations, Clementi Public Library serves the residents of South West Community Development Council.

Layout
Covering an area of 1,900 m2, it contains a children’s section, a new arrivals section, a newspaper reading corner and an adult section on level 5 of the mall.

See also
National Library Board
List of libraries in Singapore

References

External links
 National Library Board

2011 establishments in Singapore
Libraries established in 2011
Libraries in Singapore
Clementi